Nickel dicyanide is the inorganic compound with a chemical formula Ni(CN)2.  It is a gray-green solid that is insoluble in most solvents.

Production
Addition of two equivalents of sodium or potassium cyanide to a solution of nickel(II) ions in aqueous solution leads to the precipitation of nickel(II) cyanide tetrahydrate. On heating the tetrahydrate to 140 °C, this hydrate converts to anhydrous nickel(II) cyanide.

Chemical properties

Nickel(II) cyanide dissolves in potassium cyanide solution to produce a yellowish solution containing potassium tetracyanonickelate:
 Ni(CN)2 + 2 KCN → K2[Ni(CN)4]
Nickel(II) cyanide will react with dimethylglyoxime (dmgH2) and produce hydrogen cyanide:
 Ni(CN)2 + 2dmgH2 → Ni(dmgH)2 + 2HCN

See also
 Palladium dicyanide

References

Nickel compounds
Cyanides